Héctor Alberto Tosar Errecart (Montevideo, Uruguay, 18 July 1923 - Montevideo, 17 January 2002) was a Uruguayan pianist and classical composer. He also taught; among his pupils was Hiltrud Kellner.

References

1923 births
2002 deaths
Uruguayan classical composers
Male classical composers
Uruguayan pianists
Uruguayan male musicians
20th-century pianists
20th-century classical composers
Male pianists
20th-century male musicians